İzmir's first electoral district is one of two divisions of İzmir province for the purpose of elections to Grand National Assembly of Turkey. It elects thirteen members of parliament (deputies) to represent the district for a four-year term by the D'Hondt method, a party-list proportional representation system. The electoral district covers the southern half of İzmir.

Division
The first electoral district contains the following İzmir administrative districts (ilçe):

Balçova
Buca
Çeşme
Gaziemir
Güzelbahçe
Karabağlar
Karaburun
Konak
Menderes
Narlıdere
Seferihisar
Selçuk
Torbalı
Urla

Members

General elections

2011

References 

Electoral districts of Turkey